Paswal Sharif is a village of Rawalpindi District in the Punjab province of Pakistan near Lahore Islamabad Motorway. It is located at 33.5148° N, 72.8722° E with an altitude of 513 metres in Fateh jang Tehsil and lies south of the district capital, Rawalpindi near New Islamabad International Airport.

Telecommunication 
The PTCL provides the main network of landline telephone. Many ISPs and all major mobile phone, Wireless companies operating in Pakistan provide service in Paswal Sharif.

Languages 
Punjabi is the main language of Paswal Sharif, other languages are Urdu Pothohari , and rarely spoken language Pashto.

References 

Villages in Rawalpindi District